This was the first edition of the event. Andre Begemann and Tim Puetz won the title, defeating Jesse Huta Galung and Rameez Junaid in the final, 6–3, 6–3.

Seeds 

  Martin Emmrich /  Nicholas Monroe (first round)
  Johan Brunström /  Henri Kontinen (quarterfinals)
  Julian Knowle /  Michal Mertiňák (semifinals)
  Jesse Huta Galung /  Rameez Junaid (final)

Draw

Draw

References

Sources
 Main Draw

Heilbronner Neckarcupandnbsp;- Doubles
2014 Doubles